Lahemaa National Park is a park in northern Estonia, 70 kilometers east from the capital Tallinn. The Gulf of Finland is to the north of the park and the Tallinn-Narva highway (E20) is to the south. Its area covers 747 km2 (including 274.9 km2 of sea). It was the first area to be designated a national park of the former Soviet Union. It is the largest park in Estonia and one of Europe's biggest national parks. Its charter calls for the preservation, research and promotion of North-Estonian landscapes, ecosystems, biodiversity and national heritage.

History
The name Lahemaa originates from the most thoroughly studied and visited part of the North Estonian coast, where four large peninsulas (Juminda, Pärispea, Käsmu and Vergi) are separated from each other by four bays (Kolga, Hara, Eru and Käsmu). Lahemaa translates roughly as "Land of Bays".

The national park, established in 1971, is one of the main tourism drawcards in Estonia. Several companies offer day tour packages from Tallinn, while many people drive themselves.

With forests covering more than 70 percent of Lahemaa, the area is rich in flora and fauna. The landscape has many raised bogs, including the 7,000-year-old Laukasoo Reserve. The park, marked by several trails, teems with wildlife, including a population of boar, red deer, wolves, bear and lynx. The coast is covered with rocks and boulders, used each year by cranes as a stopover on their way to the Bosphorus and Egypt.

There are four manors situated in the national park: Palmse manor, the picturesque Vihula manor, Kolga manor, and the baroque Sagadi Manor, Estonia's most visited manor which together with the other three comprise one of the most unusual group of manors in the country.

Prior to 1991, the Soviet Union operated a large secret submarine base at Hara. The base was built in the 1950s during the height of the Cold War. The ruins of this former Soviet submarine base is now located entirely in Lahemaa near the Lahemaa lighthouse.

Gallery

See also
 Protected areas of Estonia
 List of national parks in the Baltics

References

External links

Lahemaa National Park in Estonica

National parks of Estonia
Geography of Harju County
Geography of Lääne-Viru County
Protected areas established in 1971
1971 establishments in Estonia
Tourist attractions in Harju County
Tourist attractions in Lääne-Viru County